The 2008 MLS SuperDraft took place on January 18, 2008 in Baltimore, Maryland.  It was the ninth annual Major League Soccer SuperDraft. The first selection was made by the Kansas City Wizards, after acquiring the selection from the expansion San Jose Earthquakes.  It was followed by the Supplemental Draft.

Player selection
Any player whose name is marked with an * was contracted under the Generation Adidas program.

Round one

Round one trades

Round two

Round two trades

Round three

Round three trades

Round four

Round four trades

Other draft day trades 
 Los Angeles sent Chris Albright to New England for allocation money.
 Real Salt Lake sent Alecko Eskandarian to Chivas USA for allocation.

See also 
 Draft (sports)
 Generation Adidas
 Major League Soccer
 MLS SuperDraft

References 

Major League Soccer drafts
SuperDraft
MLS SuperDraft
2000s in Baltimore
Soccer in Baltimore
Events in Baltimore
MLS SuperDraft